Beneath the Palms on the Blue Sea is a 1957 German-Italian musical film directed by Hans Deppe and starring Bibi Johns, Giulia Rubini and Harald Juhnke.

Cast
 Bibi Johns as Kitty Bruhns
 Giulia Rubini as Marina Morini
 Harald Juhnke as Freddy Glass
 Teddy Reno as himself, Singer
 Horst Uhse as Horst Rasemann
 Lil Dagover as Contessa Celestina Morini
 Charles Regnier as Cesare, the Contessa's butler
 Helmut Zacharias as himself
 Käthe Itter
 Attilio Torelli
 Tonino Cianci
 Peter Cornehlsen as Peter
 Michael Lengauer
 Horst Kraft

References

Bibliography 
 Hans-Michael Bock and Tim Bergfelder. The Concise Cinegraph: An Encyclopedia of German Cinema. Berghahn Books, 2009.

External links 
 

1957 films
1957 musical films
German musical films
West German films
1950s German-language films
Films directed by Hans Deppe
Italian musical films
1950s German films
1950s Italian films